Abass is a given name. Notable people with the name include:

Abass Akande Obesere (born 1965), native of Ibadan in Nigeria and popular Fuji musician
Abass Alavi, Iranian-American Professor of Radiology and Neurology
Abass Baraou (born 1994), German boxer
Abass Bundu, former politician and diplomat from Sierra Leone
Abass Cheikh Dieng (born 1985), Senegalese footballer
Abass Ibrahim, Saudi Arabian singer
Abass Issah (born 1998), Ghanaian footballer
Abass Lawal (born 1980), Nigerian footballer, who plays for Khaleej Club
Abass Mohamed Nur Alfadini or Abbas al-Fadini, member of the Parliament of Sudan
Abass Mohammed (born 1995), Ghanaian footballer
Abass Rassou (born 1986), Cameroonian-Rwanda footballer
Abass Ridwan Dauda (born 1983), Ghanaian politician
Bonfoh Abass (1948–2021), Togolese politician, interim president of Togo from February to May 2005
DJ Abass (born Abass Abayomi Tijani), Nigerian DJ based in the United Kingdom

See also
Abaasy
Abassi (disambiguation)
Abbas I (disambiguation)
Abbas II (disambiguation)
Abbasi (disambiguation)
Abbassia
Abbassus
Abbess

Masculine given names